Ramireno is a census-designated place (CDP) in Zapata County, Texas, United States. This was a new CDP for the 2010 census with a population of 35.

History
It was located on land granted to Don José Luis Ramírez by the King of Spain in 1784, part of the colonization effort of Col. José de Escandón. Ramírez, resident of Revilla (now Guerrero), Nuevo Santander (now Tamaulipas), along with his wife María Bacilia Martínez, and their children moved across the Rio Grande and established a home on their land in present Zapata County. They had ten children, and their families and descendants formed the nucleus of the community of Ramireño.

Geography

References

Census-designated places in Zapata County, Texas
Census-designated places in Texas